Lesozavodsky or Lesozavodskoy (both masculine), Lesozavodskaya (feminine), or Lesozavodskoye is the name of several rural localities in Russia.

Modern localities
Lesozavodskoy, a settlement in Gorkhonsky Selsoviet of Zaigrayevsky District of the Republic of Buryatia
Lesozavodsky, Murmansk Oblast, an inhabited locality in Lesozavodsky Territorial Okrug of Kandalakshsky District of Murmansk Oblast
Lesozavodsky, Tyumen Oblast, a settlement in Tyunevsky Rural Okrug of Nizhnetavdinsky District of Tyumen Oblast

Alternative names
Lesozavodskoy, alternative name of Lesozavodsky, an inhabited locality in Lesozavodsky Territorial Okrug of Kandalakshsky District of Murmansk Oblast